Saheb Biwi Aur Gangster is a series of Indian Hindi-language romantic thriller films co-written, co-produced and directed by Tigmanshu Dhulia. Its title was inspired by 1962's Bollywood film Sahib Bibi Aur Ghulam. The film series stars Jimmy Sheirgill as Aditya Pratap Singh (Saheb) and Mahi Gill as Madhavi Deva (Biwi). The first film named Saheb, Biwi Aur Gangster was released in 2011 and the second film Saheb, Biwi Aur Gangster Returns released in 2013. Both films received critical acclaim and perform moderate success at the box office. The third film Saheb, Biwi Aur Gangster 3 released in 2018 and received poor reviews from critics for its script and weak plotlines and became a disaster at the box office.

Overview

Saheb Biwi Aur Gangster (2011)

Based in a small town in the state of Uttar Pradesh, Saheb Biwi Aur Gangster is a story packed with intrigue betrayal and ambition between a beautiful Raani (Mahi Gill), her Raja husband (Jimmy Sheirgill) and an ambitious young man Babloo (Randeep Hooda).

The Raja and his Raani live in their ancestral royal house trying to maintain the status and structure their ancestors had left behind. But due to the changing times, some extreme financial conditions and the long-gone habit of a royal having a mistress, Raja tries hard to maintain his status and financial conditions. His rival political party, belonging to Gainda Singh (Vipin Sharma), is on a constant mission to eliminate the Raja and his allies, to get a hold of the administration, which has been with this royal family for decades. Eventually, he is left with just one ally, Kanahiya (Deepraj Rana), who is Saheb's most trusted and dangerous servant. Due to the Raja's interest in his beautiful mistress, Raani yearns for his attention and tries to get him to return to her. The Raja starts taking contract killing assignments to be able to cope up with his lifestyle and to be able to get a stronger hold over his political situation while campaigning for the elections, which becomes a difficult battle considering the loss of his allies and deteriorating financial situation.

The drama deepens when the same rival gang plants Babloo (Randeep Hooda) to get information and plot the Raja's killing, as the temporary driver for Raani. Raani, saddened by the lack of her husband's attention and slightly hysterical due to the same, gets into a sexual relationship with Babloo who seems to be giving more of his time to her. In this process, Babloo falls deeply in love with Raani and confesses his assignment in front of Raja. The Raani uses Babloo to get the mistress killed to gain her husband. Babloo manages to fulfill her demand but in turn gets ambitious, wanting the Raani and the power which Saheb now holds for himself.

The climax is set at a point where Babloo has planned to execute Saheb and succeed in shooting him and Kanahiya. Later, Raani has Babloo shot dead stating that "he can only be a partner in the bedroom, but not as a Saheb". Saheb slowly recovering, as he wins the election. In the end, Raani is shown appointing a new driver for herself, which hints at a sequel.

Saheb Biwi Aur Gangster Returns (2013)

The Royal Scandal, the war for power, and fight for money continue with the return of Saheb Biwi Aur Gangster. Aditya Pratap Singh (Jimmy Sheirgill) is crippled and is trying to recover from the physical disability and his wife's betrayal. The lover cum seductress Madhavi Devi (Mahie Gill) is now an MLA, her relationship with Aditya may have broken to shambles but her relation with alcohol is deep, dark and daunting. Indrajeet Singh (Irrfan Khan), a ragged prince who has lost everything but his pride, pledges to get back his family's respect which was once destroyed by Aditya's ancestors. Ranjana (Soha Ali Khan) is a modern ambitious girl who is madly in love with Indrajeet Singh. The story takes a new turn when Aditya falls in love with Ranjana and forces Birendra, her father, for their marriage.

Saheb Biwi Aur Gangster 3 (2018)

Aditya (Jimmy Shergill) returns from jail and tries to reclaim his political legacy. On meeting London-based gangster Uday Pratap Singh (Sanjay Dutt), the war for the survival of the richest and the shrewdest begins.

Cast

Saheb Biwi Aur Gangster
 Jimmy Sheirgill as Aditya Pratap Singh
 Mahi Gill as Madhavi Devi
 Randeep Hooda as Lalit / Babloo
 Vipin Sharma as Gaindha Singh
 Deepraj Rana as Kanhaiya
 Shreya Narayan as Mahua
 Deepal Shaw as Suman
 Mukesh Tyagi as Jaiswal
 Sharad Kakkar as Tandon
 Tigmanshu Dhulia in a special appearance
 Resham as Lalit's girlfriend
 Rajiv Gupta as MLA Prabhu Tiwari
 Mukti Mohan in an item number
 Jay Patel as Jay

Saheb Biwi Aur Gangster Returns
 Jimmy Sheirgill as Aditya Pratap Singh
 Mahi Gill as Madhavi Devi
 Irrfan Khan as Indrajeet Pratap Singh aka Raja Bhaiyya
 Soha Ali Khan as Ranjana
 Pravesh Rana as Param Pratap Singh
 Deepraj Rana as Kanhaiya
 Raj Babbar as Birendra Pratap aka Bunny
 Rajiv Gupta as MLA Prabhu Tiwari
 Charanpreet Singh as A journalist
 Sujay Shankarwar as Rudy
 Anjana Sukhani as item number
 Mugdha Godse in an item number "Media Se"
 Santosh Maurya as Thakur

Saheb Biwi Aur Gangster 3
 Sanjay Dutt as Uday Pratap Singh 
 Jimmy Sheirgill as Aditya Pratap Singh  
 Mahi Gill as Madhavi Devi 
 Deepak Tijori as Vijay, Uday Pratap Singh's Brother  
 Chitrangada Singh as Suhani
 Soha Ali Khan as Ranjana 
 Kabir Bedi as Maharaja Hari Singh, Uday Pratap Singh's father 
 Nafisa Ali as Raj Mata Yashodhara, Uday Pratap Singh's mother
 Deepraj Rana as Kanhaiya
 Pamela Singh Bhutoria as Deepal, Kanhaiya's daughter
 Zakir Hussain as Bunny uncle, Ranjana's father
 Rishina Kandhari as Aditya's Mistress

Recurring cast

Crew

Release and revenue

References

Indian romantic thriller films